Tryllion may refer to:
 1018 (long-scale trillion) in Nicolas Chuquet's nomenclature, see Names of large numbers#Origins of the "standard dictionary numbers"
 1032 in Donald Knuth's -yllion nomenclature